Natalia Straub ( Kiseleva, born 27 May 1978) is a Ukraine-born German (since 2007) chess player. She received the FIDE title of Woman Grandmaster (WGM) in 1998.

Career 
Straub participated in European Youth Chess Championships and World Youth Chess Championships, where best result was gold medal in European Youth Chess Championship in girls age group U16 in Szombathely in 1993. In 1995, at Interzonal Tournament in Chişinău she has taken 37th place. In 1994, she won Ukrainian Women's Chess Championship. In 1996, in Kraków she won International Chess tournament Cracovia, as well as shared 3rd place in International Chess tournament in Frýdek-Místek. In 2000, in Baden-Württemberg won 2nd place in International Chess tournament (tournament won Joanna Dworakowska). In 2001, Natalia Straub participated in Women's World Chess Championship by knock-out system and in the first round won to Wang Yu but in second round lost to Alisa Galliamova. In 2003, in Athens International Chess tournament Acropolis shared 3rd with Nino Khurtsidze behind winner Yelena Dembo and Margarita Voiska.

References

External links
 
 
 

1978 births
Living people
Sportspeople from Luhansk
Ukrainian female chess players
German female chess players
Chess woman grandmasters